The 2000 United States presidential election in Rhode Island took place on November 7, 2000, and was part of the 2000 United States presidential election. Voters chose four representatives, or electors to the Electoral College, who voted for president and vice president.

Rhode Island voted for the Democratic Party's candidate, then Vice President Al Gore of Tennessee, over the Republican Party's candidate, Governor George W. Bush of Texas. Gore ran with Senator Joe Lieberman of Connecticut as his running mate, while Bush ran with former Secretary of Defense Dick Cheney as his running mate.

Rhode Island is one of the most reliably Democratic states in the country. This state was Democrat Al Gore's best performance in the 2000 presidential election, where he won with over 60% of the vote. Gore won all five of the Ocean State's counties and won all but two townships. Ralph Nader, running a high-profile campaign on behalf of the Green Party with Winona LaDuke as his running mate, took 6.12% of the popular vote in the state, making Rhode Island his fourth best showing in the 2000 election after Alaska, Vermont and neighboring Massachusetts.

Primaries

Democratic Primary (March 7) 

Al Gore won the primary from Rhode Island and won every county except Bristol County and Washington County. The state was worth 32 delegates.

Republican Primary (March 7)

This primary was one of the very few states Senator John McCain won in the 2000 Republican primaries against George W. Bush. He won every single county, town, and city in the state. He also won all of the state's 14 delegates.

Results

By county

By congressional district
Gore won both congressional districts.

See also
 United States presidential elections in Rhode Island

References

Rhode Island
2000
2000 Rhode Island elections